Thomas "Chicky" Grenfell Wedge (15 August 1881 – 13 December 1964) was a rugby union player born in St Ives, Cornwall.

Wedge a scrum-half played his club rugby for St Ives RFC as well as representing Cornwall, he gained 29 caps between 1903–11 and was a member of the famous 1908 County Championship winning side that beat Durham 17–3 in the final at Redruth in front of 17,000 people. He gained two international caps for England against France in 1907 and again against Wales in 1909.

"Chicky" also competed in the 1908 Summer Olympics. On 26 October he was a member of the British rugby union team (represented by Cornwall) which won the silver medal losing against Australia in the final, the game was played at White City Stadium as Twickenham was still being built at the time.

As only one medal was awarded to the side the team drew straws for who should take it home which Wedge won.

References

External links

Thomas Wedge profile

1881 births
1964 deaths
Cornish rugby union players
England international rugby union players
Medalists at the 1908 Summer Olympics
Olympic rugby union players of Great Britain
Olympic silver medallists for Great Britain
People from St Ives, Cornwall
Rugby union players at the 1908 Summer Olympics
Rugby union scrum-halves